Nardin may refer to:

 Nardin (surname)
 Nardin (plant), a flowering plant
 Nardin, Iran, a village in Semnan Province, Iran
 Nardin Rural District, an administrative subdivision of Semnan Province, Iran
 Nardin, Oklahoma, a census-designated place and unincorporated community in the United States
 Nardin Park United Methodist Church in Michigan, United States
 Nardin Academy, a private Roman Catholic school in Western New York
 Ulysse Nardin, Swiss watch manufacturer